4-Chloro-alpha-pyrrolidinovalerophenone (also known as 4-chloro-alpha-pyrrolidinopentiophenone, 4-chloro-α-PVP, 4Cl-PVP, or 4C-PVP) is an emerging recreational designer drug of the pyrrolidinophenone class, similar in structure to alpha-pyrrolidinopentiophenone (α-PVP). The pharmacology and toxicity of this compound is unknown, though it is presumed to be a stimulant drug.

In the United States, 4-chloro-α-PVP is a Schedule I Controlled Substance.

See also
 3F-PVP
 4-Chloromethcathinone
 4F-PVP
 4-Et-PVP
 MFPVP
 MOPVP
 DMPVP
 MDPV
 O-2390
 Pyrovalerone
 RTI-31

References

Pyrrolidinophenones
Designer drugs
Serotonin-norepinephrine-dopamine releasing agents
Propyl compounds